Elizabeth "Long Liz" Stride ( Gustafsdotter; 27 November 1843 – 30 September 1888) is believed to have been the third victim of the unidentified serial killer known as Jack the Ripper, who killed and mutilated at least five women in the Whitechapel and Spitalfields districts of London from late August to early November 1888.

Unlike the other four canonical Ripper victims, Stride had not been mutilated following her murder, leading some historians to suspect Stride had not actually been murdered by Jack the Ripper. However, Stride's murder occurred less than one hour before the murder of the Ripper's fourth canonical victim, Catherine Eddowes, within walking distance, and her act of murder is suspected to have been disturbed by an individual entering the crime scene upon a two-wheeled cart. In addition, both women had been murdered by slash wounds to the throat, leading most authors and researchers to consider Stride to be the third of the Ripper's canonical five victims.

Stride was nicknamed "Long Liz". Several explanations have been given for this pseudonym; some believe it sources from her married surname (a stride being a reference to a long step), while others believe this is a reference to either her height, or her general facial structure.

Early life
Stride was born Elisabeth Gustafsdotter on 27 November 1843 in Stora Tumlehed; a rural village within the parish of Torslanda, west of Gothenburg, Sweden. She was the second of four children born to Swedish farmer Gustaf Ericsson (age 32) and his wife Beata Carlsdotter (age 33). As a child, Gustafsdotter lived upon this village farm. All four children were raised in the Lutheran faith, and all were required to perform numerous chores upon the farm.

Gustafsdotter was confirmed at the Church of Torslanda on 14 August 1859 at the age of 15. The following year, she chose to relocate from Stora Tumlehed to the city of Gothenburg in search of employment. Shortly thereafter, she obtained employment as a domestic worker in the Gothenburg parish of Carl Johan, being employed by a couple named Olofsson. This employment lasted until 2 February 1864, whereupon Gustafsdotter relocated to another district of Gothenburg, again securing employment as a domestic servant. She was between 5 feet 2 inches and 5 feet 5 inches in height and had curly dark brown hair, light grey eyes and a pale complexion.

Unlike the other canonical victims of the Whitechapel murders—at least three of whom resorted to prostitution due to poverty following failed marriages—Stride became a prostitute earlier in life. Gothenburg police records dating from March 1865 confirm her arrest upon this charge. She was treated at least twice for venereal disease. On 21 April 1865, Gustafsdotter gave birth to a stillborn girl.

Relocation to London
In February 1866, Gustafsdotter moved from Gothenburg to London. Her actual reason for relocating from Sweden to England is unknown, as she is known to have told acquaintances two differing stories as to why she relocated. To some, Gustafsdotter claimed she had relocated to England due to her employment in the domestic service of "a gentleman" who lived near Hyde Park; to others, Gustafsdotter claimed she had family in London and chose to visit her relatives in the city before opting to remain in England. Whatever the truth regarding Gustafsdotter's decision to relocate to London, it is likely she funded this trip with the 65 krona she inherited following the death of her mother in August 1864, and which she had received in late 1865.

Upon her arrival in London, Gusdafsdotter learned to speak both English and Yiddish in addition to her native language. She is also known to have briefly dated a policeman in the late 1860s.

Marriage
On 7 March 1869, Gustafsdotter married John Thomas Stride, a ship's carpenter from Sheerness, who was 22 years her senior. They married in a modest ceremony at St Giles in the Fields Church. The couple had no children.

For several years after their marriage, the couple resided in East India Dock Road, operating a coffee shop in Poplar, east London. Their income was also supplemented by John Stride continuing his trade as a carpenter.

By 1874, the Strides' marriage had begun to deteriorate, although they continued to live together. The following year, John Stride sold the coffee shop, likely due to financial hardship.

Separation
In March 1877, Stride was admitted to the Poplar Workhouse, suggesting that the couple had separated by this date. However, census records from 1881 indicate the two had reunited and lived together in the district of Bow, although the couple had permanently separated by the end of that year, with Stride being admitted to a Whitechapel workhouse infirmary suffering from bronchitis in December 1881. She was discharged from this infirmary on 4 January 1882, and is believed to have taken residence in one of several common lodging-houses on Flower and Dean Street, Whitechapel, shortly thereafter. Two years later, on 24 October 1884, John Stride died of tuberculosis in the Poplar and Stepney Sick Asylum.

In the years following the collapse of her marriage and the death of her husband, Stride is known to have informed several individuals that her husband and two of her nine children had drowned in the 1878 sinking of the Princess Alice in the River Thames. According to Stride, she and her husband had been employed upon this steamer, although she had survived the accident by climbing the ship's mast, but as she had done so, she had been kicked in the mouth by another survivor of the sinking, and this injury to her palate had caused a permanent stutter.

Common lodging residences
While residing in common lodging-houses, Stride occasionally received charitable assistance from the Church of Sweden in London, and from 1885 until her death lived much of the time with local dock labourer Michael Kidney, who resided in Devonshire Street. The couple had a tumultuous relationship and regularly separated, with Stride sleeping in local lodging houses before returning to live with Kidney. In April 1887, Stride filed a formal assault charge against Kidney, although she failed to pursue this charge in court and the case was discharged.

In addition to prostitution, Stride occasionally earned income from sewing and housecleaning. An acquaintance described her as having a calm temperament, though she appeared before the Thames Magistrates' Court  on approximately eight occasions for both drunk and disorderly conduct and the use of obscene language. Occasionally, Stride used the alias Annie Fitzgerald at these hearings. Her relationship with Kidney continued in an on-and-off manner between 1885 and 1888.

1888
Following an argument on 26 September 1888, Stride and Kidney again separated, and she again took residence at 32 Flower and Dean Street (then a notorious slum and criminal rookery), informing a fellow lodger named Catherine Lane she and Kidney "had had a few words". Over the following days she regularly earned money by performing cleaning duties, both at the lodging house and for local residents, being observed by the housekeeper, Elizabeth Tanner, to be a quiet woman who occasionally performed cleaning work for the local Jewish community.

29 September
On the day prior to her murder, Stride is known to have cleaned two rooms at her lodging house, for which she was paid sixpence. That evening, she wore a black jacket and skirt, with a posy of a red rose in a spray of either maidenhair fern or asparagus leaves. Her outfit was complemented by a black crêpe bonnet. In an effort to make her clothing look more respectable, she is known to have borrowed a brush from a fellow resident. At 6:30 p.m., Stride and Elizabeth Tanner briefly visited the Queen's Head pub on Commercial Street before Stride returned alone to the lodging house.

Subsequent eyewitness accounts of Stride's movements later in the evening of 29 September and the early morning of 30 September indicate she may have been in the company of one or more acquaintances and/or clients. The first of these individuals is described as a short man with a dark moustache, wearing a morning suit and bowler hat, with whom she was seen at approximately 11:00 p.m. at a location close to Berner Street. A second eyewitness account by labourer William Marshall places Stride in the company of a man wearing a peaked cap, black coat and dark trousers standing on the pavement opposite number 58 Berner Street at approximately 11:45 p.m. According to Marshall, Stride had stood with this "decently dressed" individual, and the two had repeatedly kissed before the man had said to her: "You would say anything but your prayers."

30 September
At 12:35 a.m., PC William Smith saw Stride with a man wearing a hard felt hat standing opposite the International Working Men's Educational Club, a socialist and predominantly Jewish social club, at 40 Berner Street (since renamed Henriques Street) in Whitechapel. The man was carrying a package about 18 inches (45 cm) long. Having no reason to feel suspicious, Smith continued on his beat in the direction of Commercial Road. Between 12:35 a.m. and 12:45 a.m., dockworker James Brown saw a woman he believed to be Stride standing with her back against a wall at the corner of Berner Street speaking with a man of average build in a long black coat. Brown heard Stride say, "No. Not tonight. Some other night."

Murder
Stride's body was discovered at approximately 1:00 a.m. on Sunday 30 September 1888 in the adjacent Dutfield's Yard by Louis Diemschutz, the steward of the International Working Men's Educational Club. Diemschutz had driven into the poorly illuminated yard with his horse and two-wheeled cart, when his horse abruptly shied to the left to avoid what appeared to be a bundle lying upon the ground. Noting what he later described as a "dark object" lying on the ground, Diemschutz unsuccessfully attempted to lift the object with his whip handle before leaving his cart to inspect it. Upon lighting a match, Diemschutz saw a prone body. He immediately ran inside the club to check his wife was safe. After finding her safe and sound, he reported his discovery before the group promptly dispersed to seek help.

Blood was still flowing from a single knife wound inflicted to Stride's neck and, although her hands were cold to the touch, other sections of her body were either slightly or "quite" warm. This suggests Stride was killed shortly before Diemschutz's arrival in the yard. Several patrons of the Working Men's Educational Club who had left the premises between 12:30 and 12:50 a.m., later informed police they had observed nothing amiss.

Post-mortem
The first doctor to arrive was Frederick William Blackwell. Police surgeon Dr George Bagster Phillips, who had examined the body of previous Whitechapel murder victim Annie Chapman, arrived about 10 minutes later. Phillips's official post-mortem documents state:

Blackwell opined his belief that Stride's murderer may have pulled her backwards onto the ground by her neckerchief (the bow of which was observed to be markedly tight) before cutting her throat. Phillips concurred with this opinion, stating that Stride had probably been lying on her back when she was killed by a single, swift slash wound from left to right across her neck, strongly indicating her murderer had been right-handed. Bruising on Stride's chest suggested that she had been pinned to the ground prior to the wound to her neck being inflicted.

Investigation
Police searched the crime scene and interrogated everyone who had been at the International Working Men's Educational Club, as well as all residents of the area.

Israel Schwartz told investigators he had seen Stride being attacked outside Dutfield's Yard at approximately 12:45 a.m. by a man with dark hair, a small brown moustache and approximately 5 feet 5 inches in height. According to Schwartz, this man attempted to pull Stride onto the street before turning her around and shoving her to the ground. As Schwartz had observed this assault, Stride's assailant shouted the word "Lipski" either to Schwartz himself or to a second man who had exited the club amidst this altercation and lit a pipe. Schwartz did not testify at the inquest on Stride, possibly because he was of Hungarian descent and spoke very little, if any, English. Ripper investigator Stephen Knight found Schwartz's statement in case files in the 1970s. At approximately the same time, Stride (or a woman matching her description) was seen by James Brown rejecting the advances of a stoutish man slightly taller than her in the adjacent street to Berner Street (Fairclough Street). A note in the margin of the Home Office files on the case points out that there was sufficient time for Stride to meet another individual between her death and the latest sightings of her.

No money was found on or near Stride's body. This indicated that her money could have been taken during or after the altercation witnessed by Israel Schwartz, or by her murderer if it were not the same person. It seemed she had willingly entered Dutfield's Yard and had either encountered her murderer within or had walked there with the person before being attacked.

Mrs Fanny Mortimer, who lived two doors away from the club, had stood in Berner Street to listen to the communal singing at about the time Stride had been murdered, but had not seen anyone entering the yard or heard anything amiss. Mortimer did see a man with a shiny black bag race past, and this was reported widely in the press. However, one of the club's members, Leon Goldstein, identified himself as the man Mortimer had seen and he was soon eliminated from the inquiry.

On 19 October, Chief Inspector Swanson reported that 80,000 leaflets appealing for information about the murder had been distributed around Whitechapel, noting that, among other lines of enquiry, some 2,000 lodgers had been interrogated or investigated in relation to her death.

Reaction of Michael Kidney
On 1 October, a drunken Michael Kidney walked into Leman Street police station and accused the police of incompetence, stating that had he been a policeman on duty in Berner Street during the murder, he would have shot himself.

Kidney has been suspected of being Stride's murderer because of their turbulent relationship and because there is no record of his alibi. However, investigators appear to have eliminated Kidney from their inquiries.

The following year, Whitechapel Workhouse Infirmary records show Kidney visited three times: for syphilis in June 1889; for lumbago that August; and for dyspepsia in October. Kidney's declining health and general distress in the year after Stride's murder indicates a detrimental psychological and emotional reaction to her death.

Inquest
The inquest into Stride's death was opened at the Vestry Hall, Cable Street, St George in the East on 1 October. This inquest was presided over by the Middlesex coroner, Wynne Edwin Baxter. The first day of the inquest heard testimony from three witnesses: two patrons of the International Working Men's Educational Club who had been in the premises on the night of Stride's murder, and Louis Diemschutz. The two patrons to testify—William Wess and Morris Eagle—each stated approximately 25 to 30 individuals had been in the club at the time of the discovery of Stride's body, that they had heard nothing amiss while in the club, with Wess also stating Stride's body could not have been in the location where Diemschutz had discovered her when he had left the premises at approximately 12:15 a.m. Diemschutz recounted his discovery of Stride's body before informing the coroner the first medical personnel at the scene had arrived "about twenty minutes" after the police.

The second day of the inquest heard conflicting testimony as to the identity of the deceased. Although police were certain the woman was Stride, a Mrs Mary Malcolm swore the body was that of her sister, Elizabeth Watts. Physician and surgeon Frederick Blackwell said he had been summoned to the crime scene at precisely 1:16 a.m. on 30 September by a policeman, being joined by Dr Phillips approximately 20 minutes later. Blackwell testified blood was still flowing from Stride's neck wound into a gutter and down a drain close to her feet, and that he estimated death had occurred "from twenty minutes to half an hour" prior to his arrival. As the blood vessels on only one side of Stride's neck had been cut, with her carotid artery only partially severed, Blackwell stated her death would have occurred "comparatively slowly", and that Stride would have been unable to cry for help.

Character testimony
On 3 October, the housekeeper of the common lodging-house Stride resided in at the time of her murder, Elizabeth Tanner, testified that Stride, who she knew as "Long Liz", had lodged at 32 Flower and Dean Street "on and off, for the last six years". Prior to 26 September, she "had been away from my [lodging] house about three months". Tanner stated Stride had been a "very quiet" and sober woman. Tanner said that, although Stride had Swedish heritage, she had "[spoken] English as well as an English woman". Stride had informed her that her husband and children had drowned in the 1878 Princess Alice paddle steamer sinking.

Charwoman Catherine Lane also testified she knew Stride as a Swede named Long Liz whom she had known for about six months. Lane said Stride had informed her shortly before her death that she had "had a few words" with her partner, and that this was the reason she was again taking residence at Flower and Dean Street. Stride had given Lane a large piece of green velvet as she left the lodging-house before her death, asking Lane to "mind" the garment until she returned.

On 3 October, Michael Kidney formally identified Stride's body, stating the two had been in a relationship for "nearly three years". He added that they had occasionally separated because of Stride's heavy drinking, although she inevitably returned to him.

Medical testimony
Dr Phillips testified that the cause of death had been "undoubtedly the loss of blood from the left carotid artery and the division of the windpipe." He firmly believed Stride had been "seized by the shoulders and placed on the ground, and that [her] murderer was [kneeling to] her right side" when he had inflicted the wound to her throat.

Conclusion
The inquest into Stride's murder lasted five days, with the final day of hearings being adjourned until 23 October. This final day of the hearing saw three witnesses testify—all of whom provided testimony confirming the identity of the decedent.

At the conclusion of this final day of hearings, coroner Baxter stated his belief that Stride had been attacked in a swift, sudden manner, with her death undoubtedly being a homicide, and no known circumstances being available which could reduce the crime to one of manslaughter. The murderer could have taken advantage of the checked scarf Stride was wearing to grab her from behind before slitting her throat, as had earlier been suggested by Phillips. Baxter, however, thought the absence of a shout for assistance and the lack of obvious marks of a struggle indicated that Stride had willingly lain down on the ground before the wound had been inflicted. Stride was still clenching a packet of cachous in her left hand when she was discovered, indicating that she had not had time to defend herself and that the attack had been sudden.

In relation to the actual crime scene, Baxter noted the decedent had been attacked in the passageway leading into a courtyard in which several families resided in cottages located a matter of yards from where her body was discovered, and that although this location afforded darkness, it was unlikely the murderer would have selected the location on account of Dutfield's Yard being an unfrequented location. Baxter further noted the windows of the International Working Men's Educational Club had been open, and that both Stride and her assailant would undoubtedly have heard the patrons' singing and dancing.

With regard to the witness testimony pertaining to the man or men seen in Stride's company in the two hours before the discovery of her body, Baxter stated many points of similarity had been given with regards to the physical description of the individual in her company, but also some of dissimilarity. However, Baxter stated these discrepancies did not conclusively prove there had been more than one man in the company of Stride between 11:00 p.m. and 12:45 a.m., but that the eyewitness descriptions suggested either that she had been in the company of a minimum of two men in her final hours, or that one or more eyewitness was mistaken in details of the description of the man he had seen.

Following a short deliberation, the jury, having been instructed to deliberate precisely how, when, and by what means Stride came about her death, returned a unanimous verdict: "Wilful murder against some person or persons unknown."

Connection to Jack the Ripper
Stride's murder occurred in the midst of the spree of murders attributed to a serial offender known prior to her death as both the Whitechapel Murderer and Leather Apron, and due to a letter forwarded to Scotland Yard the day immediately prior to her death as Jack the Ripper. However, unlike at least three other murder victims then-ascribed to this perpetrator (each of whom had received extensive abdominal injuries in addition to one or more slash wounds across her neck), Stride had received no mutilation injuries, with her sole injury being a deep cut measuring two-and-a-half-inches beneath her jaw, which had severed her left carotid artery and trachea and had terminated beneath her right jaw.

As two other murders (those of Mary Ann Nichols and Annie Chapman) had occurred in the districts of Whitechapel and Spitalfields—both of which had been initially caused by knife wounds to the throat—within the previous month, Stride's murder was added to the Whitechapel murders investigation, and was widely believed to have been perpetrated by the same killer. However, some commentators on the case conclude that Stride's murder was unconnected to the other canonical murders This opinion is upon the basis that the body had not been subjected to any mutilation and that this murder was the only murder ascribed to Jack the Ripper to occur south of Whitechapel Road. Furthermore, it is believed that the blade used to cause the wound to Stride's neck may have been shorter and of a different design than that used to murder and subsequently mutilate the other four canonical murder victims. Most experts, however, consider the similarities in this case distinctive enough to connect Stride's murder with the two earlier Ripper murders, in addition to the murder of Catherine Eddowes later that same night.

The murder of Stride is regarded as one of the canonical Ripper killings due to numerous factors, including the general physical and lifestyle characteristics of the victim, the day of the week she had been murdered, the time of death, the murder location, and the method of her murder. It is suspected that when Stride's murderer heard Diemschutz's horse and two-wheeled cart approaching or entering Dutfield's Yard, he ceased his attack. The killer may have still been inside Dutfield's Yard upon Diemschutz's approach, as the gate on Berner Street was the only point of entry. He may have escaped when Diemschutz entered the International Working Men's Educational Club. Less than one hour later, Catherine Eddowes was murdered in Mitre Square, and both Stride and Eddowes had lived in Flower and Dean Street.

The deaths of Eddowes and Stride sent London into a renewed state of general panic, as this was the first occasion in which two murders ascribed to the Ripper had occurred in one night.

Correspondence

On 1 October, a postcard dubbed the "Saucy Jacky" postcard and also signed "Jack the Ripper", was received by the Central News Agency. This letter claimed responsibility for the murders of both Stride and Eddowes, and described the killing of the two women as a "double event"; a designation which has endured. It has been argued that this postcard was mailed before the murders were publicised, making it unlikely that a crank would hold such detailed knowledge of the crime. However, the letter was postmarked more than 24 hours after the killings had occurred; long after details of the murders were known by both journalists and residents of the area. Police officials later claimed to have identified a journalist as the author of the postcard, leading this letter to be dismissed as a hoax, an assessment shared by most Ripper historians.

Two weeks later, on 16 October, a parcel containing half a preserved human kidney, accompanied by a note, was received by the Chairman of the Whitechapel Vigilance Committee, George Lusk. This note has become known as both the "Lusk letter" and the "From hell" letter, because of the return address used by the writer: "From hell". The author of this letter claimed to have "fried and ate" the missing half of the human kidney. The handwriting and general style of this letter significantly differ from that of the "Saucy Jacky" postcard.

The section of kidney was taken to Dr Thomas Horrocks Openshaw at the nearby Royal London Hospital. He believed that the kidney was human and originated from the left side of the individual from whom it had been taken. Dr Openshaw also stated the organ had been preserved in spirits prior to postage.

Acting Commissioner of the City Police, Major Henry Smith, claimed in his memoirs that this kidney matched the one missing from the body of Catherine Eddowes, because the length of renal artery attached to the kidney matched the missing length from Eddowes's body, and that the forensic examination conducted upon Eddowes's body and the section of kidney revealed signs of Bright's disease. Smith's story is considered by some historians to be a dramatic recollection on his part.

Other theories
In his book Jack the Ripper: The Final Solution, author Stephen Knight linked the prominent physician Sir William Gull to Stride on the basis that both were reported to carry grapes; a theory which another author, Martin Fido, has dismissed as a "wild allegation".

A grocer named Matthew Packer is known to have implied to two private detectives employed by the Whitechapel Vigilance Committee named Le Grand and Batchelor that he had sold some grapes to Stride and her murderer shortly before her death. When interviewed by the police, Packer described the man he had seen as being aged between 25 and 30, slightly taller than Stride, and wearing a soft felt hat. Neither of Packer's descriptions of this individual matched witness statements provided by other witnesses who may also have seen Stride with potential clients shortly before her murder. However, overall, the witness descriptions given to police of individuals seen either in the company of Stride or the vicinity of her murder differed significantly. Moreover, Packer is known to have also informed a police sergeant named Stephen White that he had closed his shop on the date of the murder without seeing any suspicious characters or activity.

At the inquest into Stride's murder, pathologists had stated emphatically that the decedent had not held, swallowed or consumed grapes in the hours before her death. Both Blackwell and Phillips described the contents of Stride's stomach as being "cheese, potatoes and farinaceous powder".

Despite Packer's self-contradictory statements, investigators did discover a single grape stalk in Dutfield's Yard, and his story was reported in the London Evening News on 3 October. Nonetheless, the overall commander of the investigation into the Ripper murders, Chief Inspector Donald Swanson, is known to have stated that "any statement [made by grocer Matthew Packer] would be rendered almost valueless as evidence" and had likely been fabricated in order that Packer could sell his story to the press.

Further doubt is cast on the truthfulness of Packer's accounts by the general character of Le Grand (also known as Charles Grand, Charles Grandy, Charles Grant, Christian Neilson, and Christian Nelson). This individual had accrued an extensive criminal record, which included assault on a prostitute and conviction for theft. He was convicted of conspiracy to defraud in 1889 and served two years' imprisonment. After his release, he was arrested while in possession of a revolver and charged with demanding money with menace; a crime for which he was sentenced to twenty years' imprisonment.

Funeral
Elizabeth Stride was buried on Saturday 6 October 1888 in the East London Cemetery, located within the east London district of Plaistow. Her funeral was attended by a small number of mourners, and the costs were provided at the expense of the parish by the undertaker, a Mr Hawkes.

Her headstone is inscribed with her name and the years of her birth and death.

Media

Film
 A Study in Terror (1965). This film casts Norma Foster as Elizabeth Stride.
 Love Lies Bleeding (1999). A drama film directed by William Tannen. Stride is portrayed by Alice Bendová in this film.
 From Hell. (2001). Directed by the Hughes Brothers, the film casts Susan Lynch as Elizabeth Stride.

Television
 Jack the Ripper (1988). A Thames Television film drama series starring Michael Caine. Elizabeth Stride is played by actress Angela Crow in this series.
 The Real Jack the Ripper (2010). Directed by David Mortin, this series casts Tina Sterling as Elizabeth Stride and was first broadcast on 31 August 2010.
 Jack the Ripper: The Definitive Story (2011). A two-hour documentary which references original police reports and eyewitness accounts pertaining to the Whitechapel Murderer. Stride is portrayed by actress Elizabeth Elstub in this documentary.

Drama
 Jack, the Last Victim (2005). This musical casts Sallie Lloyd as Elizabeth Stride.

See also
 Cold case
 List of serial killers before 1900
 Unsolved murders in the United Kingdom

Notes

References

Bibliography
 Begg, Paul (2003). Jack the Ripper: The Definitive History. London: Pearson Education. 
 Begg, Paul (2006). Jack the Ripper: The Facts. London: Anova Books. 
 Bell, Neil R. A. (2016). Capturing Jack the Ripper: In the Boots of a Bobby in Victorian England. Stroud: Amberley Publishing. 
 Cook, Andrew (2009). Jack the Ripper. Stroud, Gloucestershire: Amberley Publishing. 
 Eddleston, John J. (2002). Jack the Ripper: An Encyclopedia. London: Metro Books. 
 Evans, Stewart P.; Rumbelow, Donald (2006). Jack the Ripper: Scotland Yard Investigates. Stroud, Gloucestershire: Sutton Publishing. 
 Evans, Stewart P.; Skinner, Keith (2000). The Ultimate Jack the Ripper Sourcebook: An Illustrated Encyclopedia. London: Constable and Robinson. 
 Evans, Stewart P.; Skinner, Keith (2001). Jack the Ripper: Letters from Hell. Stroud, Gloucestershire: Sutton Publishing. 
 Fido, Martin (1987). The Crimes, Death and Detection of Jack the Ripper. Vermont: Trafalgar Square. 
 Gordon, R. Michael (2000). Alias Jack the Ripper: Beyond the Usual Whitechapel Suspects. North Carolina: McFarland Publishing. 
 Harris, Melvin (1994). The True Face of Jack the Ripper. London: Michael O'Mara Books Ltd. 
 Holmes, Ronald M.; Holmes, Stephen T. (2002). Profiling Violent Crimes: An Investigative Tool. Thousand Oaks, California: Sage Publications, Inc. 
 Honeycombe, Gordon (1982). The Murders of the Black Museum: 1870-1970, London: Bloomsbury Books. 
 Lynch, Terry; Davies, David (2008). Jack the Ripper: The Whitechapel Murderer. Hertfordshire: Wordsworth Editions. 
 Marriott, Trevor (2005). Jack the Ripper: The 21st Century Investigation. London: John Blake. 
 Rumbelow, Donald (2004). The Complete Jack the Ripper: Fully Revised and Updated. London: Penguin Books. 
 Sugden, Philip (2002). The Complete History of Jack the Ripper. Carroll & Graf Publishers. 
 Waddell, Bill (1993). The Black Museum: New Scotland Yard. London: Little, Brown and Company. 
 White, Jerry (2007). London in the Nineteenth Century. London: Jonathan Cape. 
 Whittington-Egan, Richard; Whittington-Egan, Molly (1992). The Murder Almanac. Glasgow: Neil Wilson Publishing. 
 Whittington-Egan, Richard (2013). Jack the Ripper: The Definitive Casebook. Stroud: Amberley Publishing. 
 Woods, Paul; Baddeley, Gavin (2009). Saucy Jack: The Elusive Ripper. Hersham, Surrey: Ian Allan Publishing.

Further reading
 Begg, Paul (2014). Jack the Ripper: The Forgotten Victims. London: Yale University Press. 
 Yost, David (2008). Elizabeth Stride and Jack the Ripper: The Life and Death of the Reputed Third Victim. Jefferson, North Carolina: McFarland & Co.

External links

 4 December 1888 Queensland Times news article pertaining to the inquest into the murder of Elizabeth Stride
 2009 The Daily Telegraph article detailing the victims of Jack the Ripper
 BBC News article pertaining to the murders committed by Jack the Ripper
 Casebook: Jack the Ripper
 The Whitechapel Murder Victims: Elizabeth Stride at whitechapeljack.com

1843 births
1880s murders in London
1888 deaths
1888 in London
1888 murders in the United Kingdom
19th-century Swedish people
19th-century Swedish women
Female murder victims
Jack the Ripper victims
People from Gothenburg
People of the Victorian era
September 1888 events
Swedish emigrants to the United Kingdom
Swedish people murdered abroad
Swedish prostitutes